Fool's Luck is a 1926 American silent comedy film directed by Roscoe Arbuckle.

Cast
 Lupino Lane as The Dude
 George Davis as His Valet
 Virginia Vance as The Girl
 Jack Lloyd as Her Father
 Mark Hamilton as Express Mover/ Truck Driver

See also
 Fatty Arbuckle filmography

References

External links

1926 films
Films directed by Roscoe Arbuckle
Educational Pictures films
Silent American comedy films
1926 short films
American silent short films
American black-and-white films
Films with screenplays by Roscoe Arbuckle
American comedy short films
1926 comedy films
1920s American films